Altai Krai is a federal subject of Russia (a krai). It borders clockwise from the west, Kazakhstan (East Kazakhstan Region and Pavlodar Region), Novosibirsk and Kemerovo Oblasts, and the Altai Republic. The krai's administrative centre is the city of Barnaul. As of the 2010 Census, the population of the krai was 2,163,693.

Name 
The region is named after the Altai Mountains.

Geography

Altai Krai has rolling foothills, grasslands, lakes, rivers, and mountains.

The climate is severe with long cold dry winters and hot, usually dry summers. The region's main waterway is the Ob River, which gives its name to the Ob Plateau. The Biya and  Katun Rivers are also important. The biggest lakes are Lake Kulunda, Lake Kuchuk, Bolshoye Topolnoye and Lake Mikhaylov.

Altai Krai has rich natural resources, including lumber, as well as significant mineral reserves. These include the nonferrous metals lead, manganese, tungsten, molybdenum, bauxite, and gold, as well as  iron ore. See also Geography of South-Central Siberia.

The area is home to animals considered rare, including the endangered snow leopard.

History
Bone fragments of the Denisova hominin originate from the Denisova Cave in Altai Krai.

This area is part of a great crossroads in the ancient world. Nomadic tribes crossed through the territory during periods of migration. These nomadic tribes consisted of different peoples. Archeological sites reveal that ancient humans lived in the area. The Altay people are a Turkic people, some of whom settled here, who were originally nomadic and date back to the 2nd millennium BC.

The territory of the krai has been controlled by the Xiongnu Empire (209 BC-93 AD), the Rouran Khaganate (330-555), the Mongol Empire (1206-1368), the Golden Horde, the Northern Yuan (1368-1691) and the Zunghar Khanate (1634–1758).

After the Russian Revolution and the rise of the Russian Soviet Federative Socialist Republic, the policy of war communism was imposed on the rural population of Altai Krai, destroying the livelihood of many local farmers. In response, the peasant rebellion of Sorokino broke out in 1921; this uprising was quickly crushed by the Red Army. Many locals who had taken part in the rebellion were later put on trial and convicted to hard labor or execution, in accordance with NKVD Order No. 00447 in 1937.

During the interwar period, the Soviet state collectivised the livestock and husbandry activities of the Altai population within Altai Krai, resulting in local resistance to the measures and their subsequent migration, with their herds, to China and Mongolia.

In June 1942 Altai Krai was one of the territories to which the families of men deported from Eastern Europe, in particular "foreigners" and "other ethnicities" such as Kola Norwegians, Lithuanians and Latvians, by Soviet Russia to hard labor camps.

Administrative divisions

Heraldry

Flag
The flag of Altai Krai is red, with the leftmost portion blue. The blue portion contains, in golden yellow, a stylized depiction of an upright ear of wheat. Centered in the red field is the coat of arms of the territory.

Coat of arms
The coat of arms of Altai Krai was established in 2000. It includes a shield of French heraldry form with a basement of 8/10th of its height and a sharp part in the middle of the bottom part. Bottom edges of the shield are rounded. The shield is divided with a horizontal stripe into two equal parts. In the upper part has a blue background, which is a symbol of glory, is a steamy oven of the 18th century, which reflects a historical past of the krai. In the bottom part on the red background, which is a symbol of dignity, braveness and courage, is an image of the Koluvan Queen of Vases mainly in green color, which is kept in the Hermitage Museum. The shield is framed with golden wheat ears which represent agriculture as a main industry of Altai Krai.

Politics

During the Soviet period, the high authority in the krai was shared between three persons: The first secretary of the Altai CPSU Committee (who in reality had the most authority), the chairman of the Krai Soviet (legislative power), and the Chairman of the Krai Executive Committee (executive power). Since 1991, CPSU lost all the power, and the head of the krai administration, and eventually the governor was appointed/elected alongside elected regional parliament.

The Charter of Altai Krai is the fundamental law of the region. The Legislative Assembly of Altai Krai is the regional standing legislative (representative) body. The Legislative Assembly exercises its authority by passing laws, resolutions, and other legal acts and by supervising the implementation and observance of the laws and other legal acts passed by it. The highest executive body is the Krai Government, which includes territorial executive bodies such as district administrations, committees, and commissions that facilitate development and run the day to day matters of the province. The Krai Administration supports the activities of the Governor who is the highest official and acts as guarantor of the observance of the krai Charter in accordance with the Constitution of Russia.

On August 7, 2005, the krai's then-head of administration Mikhail Yevdokimov died in a car crash.

List of chairpersons of the Altai Krai Legislative Assembly 
The chairperson of the Altai Krai Legislative Assembly is the presiding officer of that legislature.

Office-holders

Economy
As of 2013 the Krai's largest enterprises were supermarket chain , coke fuel producer Altai-Koks and rolling stock manufacturer Altaivagon. Evalar - a prominent dietary supplement manufacturer - is also located in Altai Krai.

In January 2019, the average wage in Altai Krai was 23,941 RUB, which was an increase of 6.3% over the previous year.

Demographics
Population:

Ethnic groups

Births: 30,739 (2011) 
Deaths: 35,114 (2011) 

Vital statistics for 2012
Births: 32 695 (13.6 per 1000)
Deaths: 35 030 (14.6 per 1000) 
Total fertility rate:
2009 - 1.62 | 2010 - 1.63 | 2011 - 1.65 | 2012 - 1.81 | 2013 - 1.83 | 2014 - 1.84 | 2015 - 1.81 | 2016 - 1.79(e)

Settlements

Religion

According to a 2012 survey 22.6% of the population of Altay Krai adheres to the Russian Orthodox Church, 3% are unaffiliated Christians, 1% are Orthodox Christian believers without belonging to any church or are adherents of other Orthodox churches, 1% are adherents of Islam. In addition, 31% of the population declares to be "spiritual but not religious", 27% is atheist, and 14.4% follows other religions or did not give an answer to the question.

Sister district
 Xinjiang, China

See also
Altai Mountains
Sayan Mountains
Denisova Cave
List of Chairmen of the Altai Krai Legislative Assembly

References

Notes

Sources

External links

Official website of Altai Krai
Official website of Altai Krai 
Kommersant.com. Information about Altai Krai
Library of Congress Russian (pdf)
 History of Altai Krai
Altai: a living spirit

 
Central Asia
Krais of Russia
States and territories established in 1937
Russian-speaking countries and territories